The 2ES10 is a twin section (Bo'Bo)(Bo'Bo') freight locomotive manufactured from 2010 by Ural Locomotives. RZD ordered 221 units in 2010. Ukrainian Railways ordered 50 units in 2013.

History and design
The 2ES10  is a two unit 8 axle electric freight locomotive manufactured for RZD by Ural Locomotives, a joint venture between Sinara Group of Russia (base platform and auxiliary equipment) and Siemens of Germany (traction electrical equipment).

The 2ES10 offers double the power output of VL11 locomotives, with lower operating and maintenance costs. During trials in August 2010, a three-section 2ES10 hauled a  train across the Urals.

In May 2010, Russian Railways signed an order for 221 2ES10 locomotives. The first prototype locomotive was presented 18 November 2010.

In 2012 the company JSC "Apatite" (ОАО "Апатит") acquired one locomotive, 2ES10-222.

In 2013 Ukrainian Railways sign an agreement to lease 50 2ES10 units as part of a larger 350 locomotive order; the first unit was delivered in Dec. 2013.

References

External links

 

Railway locomotives introduced in 2010
Electric locomotives of Russia
Sinara Group
5 ft gauge locomotives